The Varreler Bäke (in its upper course: Klosterbach) is a stream of Lower Saxony and Bremen, Germany.

From Tölkenbrück (a district of Stuhr), the Klosterbach is given the name Varreler Bäke. This then flows for a short distance through the district of Diepholz (Lower Saxony).

It is part of the Weser basin.

In Varrel there is still a water mill, witness to the fact that the water power of streams was once used to generate power in order to run corn mills.

See also
List of rivers of Lower Saxony
List of rivers of Bremen

References

External links 
 NLWK Betriebsstelle Sulingen; darin: Varreler Bäke

Rivers of Lower Saxony
Rivers of Bremen (state)
Diepholz (district)
Rivers of Germany